Elk Fork Township is an inactive township in Pettis County, in the U.S. state of Missouri.

Elk Fork Township was erected in 1833, taking its name from the Elk Fork creek.

References

Townships in Missouri
Townships in Pettis County, Missouri